Minjiang University is a public university located in Minhou County, Fuzhou, Fujian, China. The university is a comprehensive, multi-disciplinary university accredited by the Chinese Education Ministry the right to confer undergraduate degrees to students in China.

Faculties
The university is organised into various departments.

Department of Chinese Languages
Department of Foreign Languages
Department of History
Department of Mathematics
Department of Physics and Telecommunications Engineering
Department of Chemistry and Chemical Engineering
Department of Computer Science
Department of Geography
Department of Tourism
Department of Public Economics and Finances
Department of Art
Department of Management
Department of Law
Department of Garment and Art Engineering
Software Training Base of Minjiang University
Department of Physical Education 
Esthetical and Moral Education Department
College of Adult Education
New Huadu Business School
Straits Institute of Minjiang University
Fuzhou Melbourne Polytechnic

Campuses
Minjiang University's main campus is located in Fuzhou University Town, very close to the Jinfu highway. It lies at the foot of Qi Mountain, Shangjie District, Minhou County of Fuzhou City. The university has three other branch campuses located in the Gongye Road, Changle Road and Hongtang Road.

See also
2018 Minjiang University Protests

References

External links
Minjiang University (Official Website)

Universities and colleges in Fujian
Education in Fuzhou
Educational institutions established in 1958
1958 establishments in China
Educational institutions established in 2002
2002 establishments in China